Nord-Vågsøy is a former municipality in the old Sogn og Fjordane county, Norway.  The municipality existed from 1910 until 1964, and it encompassed the northern part of the island of Vågsøy.  The area of Nord-Vågsøy now makes up the northern part of the present-day Kinn Municipality in Vestland county.  The administrative centre was the village of Raudeberg where the Nord-Vågsøy Church is located.  Other villages in Nord-Vågsøy include Halsør, Vedvik, Refvik, Kvalheim, and Kråkenes.

Name
The municipality was named Nord-Vågsøy because it encompassed the northern part of Vågsøy island (nord means "northern" in Norwegian).  The Old Norse form of the island name was Vágsøy. The first element is the genitive case of vágr which means "bay" and the last element is øy which means "island".

History
Nord-Vågsøy was originally a part of the municipality of Selje (see formannskapsdistrikt law).  On 1 January 1910, the western part of Selje was split off from the municipality to create the new municipalities of Nord-Vågsøy (population: 1,111) and Sør-Vågsøy (population: 1,517).  On 1 July 1921, the Blesrød farm in Nord-Vågsøy (just north of Måløy) was transferred to Sør-Vågsøy municipality. During the 1960s, there were many municipal mergers across Norway due to the work of the Schei Committee. On 1 January 1964, the new Vågsøy Municipality was created by merging the municipalities of Sør-Vågsøy (population: 3,926) and Nord-Vågsøy (population: 1,476) with parts of neighboring Davik and Selje municipalities.

Politically, Nord-Vågsøy was marked by the father and son Karl and Leif Iversen, who served as mayors the last forty years before the merger.

Government

Municipal council
The municipal council  of Nord-Vågsøy was made up of 17 representatives that were elected to four year terms.  The party breakdown of the final municipal council was as follows:

See also
List of former municipalities of Norway

References

External links

Kinn
Former municipalities of Norway
1910 establishments in Norway
1964 disestablishments in Norway